Tatishchevo is the name of several inhabited localities in Russia.

Urban localities
Tatishchevo, Saratov Oblast, a work settlement in Tatishchevsky District of Saratov Oblast

Rural localities
Tatishchevo, Bryansk Oblast, a village in Baklansky Selsoviet of Pochepsky District of Bryansk Oblast
Tatishchevo, Chelyabinsk Oblast, a selo in Velikopetrovsky Selsoviet of Kartalinsky District of Chelyabinsk Oblast
Tatishchevo, Ivanovo Oblast, a village in Privolzhsky District of Ivanovo Oblast
Tatishchevo, Lipetsk Oblast, a village in Petelinsky Selsoviet of Chaplyginsky District of Lipetsk Oblast
Tatishchevo, Kulikovskoye Rural Settlement, Dmitrovsky District, Moscow Oblast, a settlement in Kulikovskoye Rural Settlement of Dmitrovsky District of Moscow Oblast
Tatishchevo, Dmitrov, Dmitrovsky District, Moscow Oblast, a village under the administrative jurisdiction of the Town of Dmitrov in Dmitrovsky District of Moscow Oblast
Tatishchevo, Istrinsky District, Moscow Oblast, a village in Kostrovskoye Rural Settlement of Istrinsky District of Moscow Oblast
Tatishchevo, Naro-Fominsky District, Moscow Oblast, a village in Volchenkovskoye Rural Settlement of Naro-Fominsky District of Moscow Oblast
Tatishchevo, Solnechnogorsky District, Moscow Oblast, a village in Krivtsovskoye Rural Settlement of Solnechnogorsky District of Moscow Oblast
Tatishchevo, Volokolamsky District, Moscow Oblast, a village in Chismenskoye Rural Settlement of Volokolamsky District of Moscow Oblast
Tatishchevo, Orenburg Oblast, a selo in Tatishchevsky Selsoviet of Perevolotsky District of Orenburg Oblast
Tatishchevo, Pskov Oblast, a village in Ostrovsky District of Pskov Oblast
Tatishchevo, Tula Oblast, a village in Dorobinsky Rural Okrug of Tyoplo-Ogaryovsky District of Tula Oblast
Tatishchevo, Kimrsky District, Tver Oblast, a village in Goritskoye Rural Settlement of Kimrsky District of Tver Oblast
Tatishchevo, Oleninsky District, Tver Oblast, a village in Kholmetskoye Rural Settlement of Oleninsky District of Tver Oblast